Dempster–Skokie, formerly known as Dempster, or Skokie, is an 'L' station on the CTA's Yellow Line at 5005 Dempster Street in Skokie, Illinois (directional coordinates 8800 north, 5000 west). It is one of three stops on the Yellow Line, and currently the terminus of line, although an extension of the line to Old Orchard Mall has been considered. It is one of two CTA rail stations in Skokie, and is at grade level.

History

The station was originally constructed in 1925 as part of a new high-speed bypass route for the North Shore Line known as the Skokie Valley Route. Trains of the Chicago Rapid Transit Company's Niles Center Route also used this station as a terminal until that service was ended by the CTA in 1948. The North Shore Line ceased operating in early 1963, but the CTA instated a new service the following year which served a 'temporary' station on the same location. This service was, and to some extent still is, known as the Skokie Swift and is currently called the Yellow Line.

The current stationhouse has been in place since 1994.  The original stationhouse, known as Dempster Street Station, is listed on the U.S. National Register of Historic Places and stands 130 feet east of its original location, moved at a cost of $1 million in order to make space for the new station and its parking lot. The original station house is currently occupied by a Starbucks coffee shop and a law office; the Starbucks also has a drive-thru lane. The former station's address is 5001 Dempster Street.

Service
The station houses bus stops for CTA and Pace buses and was once the Greyhound bus Skokie terminal.  However, Greyhound discontinued service to Skokie in 2012.

On June 8, 2011, the Chicago Transit Board approved the renaming of the Skokie station to Dempster–Skokie. This was done with the announcement of the  name for the infill station at Oakton.

Location
Dempster–Skokie is located at 5005 Dempster Street at Dempster Street and Bronx Avenue. It is located in the village of Skokie, Illinois, which borders Chicago at its southwest corner and Evanston to its east. The station is the middle of a major commercial/transportation center of Skokie.

Bus connections
CTA
 54A North Cicero/Skokie Blvd
 97 Skokie

Pace
 250 Dempster Street
 620 Yellow Line Dempster/Allstate
 626 Skokie Valley Limited
The station will also be a part of the upcoming rapid transit Pace Pulse Dempster Line

Notes and references

Notes

References

External links

 Train schedule (PDF) at CTA official site
 Chicago "L".org: Stations - Skokie (Dempster)
 Dempster Station Page CTA official site
 Skokie CTA Station and Bus Terminal as viewed from Dempster Street in Google Maps Street View
 Skokie CTA Station house as viewed along Terminal Avenue from Google Maps Street View

Chicago "L" terminal stations
CTA Yellow Line stations
Former North Shore Line stations
Buildings and structures on the National Register of Historic Places in Cook County, Illinois
Railway stations on the National Register of Historic Places in Illinois
Railway stations in the United States opened in 1925
Skokie, Illinois